Alatorre is a surname. Notable people with the surname include:

Antonio Alatorre (1922–2010), Mexican writer, philologist and translator
Gloria Rubio y Alatorre or Gloria Guinness (1912–1980)
Javier Alatorre (born 1963), Mexican journalist
Marcelo Alatorre (born 1985), Mexican football defender
Patricia Alatorre (2007–2020), teenager murdered in California
Richard Alatorre (born 1943), member of the California State Assembly from 1973 to 1985

See also
Vega de Alatorre, municipality in the State of Veracruz, about 60 km from state capital Xalapa
Aladore
Alatri
Alatyr (disambiguation)
La Torre

Alatorre also comes from Spain and it also means that "At the tower" in ancestry.